Franz Joseph Emil Fischer (19 March 1877 in Freiburg im Breisgau – 1 December 1947 in Munich) was a German chemist. He was the founder and first director of the Kaiser Wilhelm Institute for Coal Research. He is known for the discovery of the Fischer–Tropsch process.

Career
In 1925, he and Hans Tropsch discovered the Fischer–Tropsch process. This allowed for the production of liquid hydrocarbons from carbon monoxide and hydrogen with metal catalyst at temperatures of 150–300 °C (302–572 °F).

In 1930, he and Hans Schrader developed the Fischer assay, a standardized laboratory test for determining the oil yield from oil shale to be expected from a conventional shale oil extraction. He also worked with Wilhelm Ostwald and Hermann Emil Fischer. In 1913, he became the Director of the Kaiser Wilhelm Institute for Coal Research in Mülheim.

He  joined the NSDAP in 1933, and remained in office until his retirement in 1943.

Awards
Wilhelm Exner Medal, 1936

References

External links
 

1877 births
1947 deaths
20th-century German chemists
20th-century German inventors
People from the Grand Duchy of Baden
Scientists from Freiburg im Breisgau
Nazi Party members
University of Giessen alumni
Technical University of Munich alumni
Ludwig Maximilian University of Munich alumni
University of Freiburg alumni
Academic staff of the Humboldt University of Berlin
Academic staff of the Technical University of Berlin
Max Planck Institute directors